Daniel MacKinnon (born 1 September 1983) is a retired New Zealand professional boxer. MacKinnon has entered the WBO top 15 rankings multiple times, peaking at #12 in the Super Middleweight Division in November 2008 and #12 in the Light Heavyweight Division August 2013.

Australian contender
MacKinnon took part in The Contender Australia, a reality television show based on the sport of boxing. The show practically was a fourteen-man tournament with boxers hailing from Australia and New Zealand. MacKinnon won his first bout against Luke Moloney which put him into the quarter finals. Unfortunately Mackinnon lost against Josh Clenshaw by Majority Decision.

MacKinnon vs Berridge
MacKinnion fought Robert Berridge for the vacant WBO Oriental and WBA PABA Light Heavyweight titles. This fight was the highest ranked fight between two New Zealander's in the Light Heavyweight division in New Zealand History. Unfortunately lost by TKO in the tenth round. MacKinnon was rushed to hospital after the fight. After a CT scan it was discovered that MacKinnon had a brain bleed and had emergency surgery. MacKinnon was in a coma however woke up less than 24 hours after the surgery. MacKinnon made a fully recover however his boxing career is over.

Professional boxing titles
World Boxing Organisation
WBO Oriental light heavyweight title (2013)
WBO Oriental super middleweight title (2007)
New Zealand National Boxing Federation 
New Zealand National middleweight title (2005)

Professional boxing record

|-  style="text-align:center; background:#e3e3e3;"
|  style="border-style:none none solid solid; "|Res.
|  style="border-style:none none solid solid; "|Record
|  style="border-style:none none solid solid; "|Opponent
|  style="border-style:none none solid solid; "|Type
|  style="border-style:none none solid solid; "|Rd., Time
|  style="border-style:none none solid solid; "|Date
|  style="border-style:none none solid solid; "|Location
|  style="border-style:none none solid solid; "|Notes
|- align=center
|Lose
|21–8–1
|align=left| Robert Berridge
|
|
|
|align=left|
|align=left|
|- align=center
|Lose
|21–7–1
|align=left| Blake Caparello
|
|
|
|align=left|
|align=left|
|- align=center
|Win
|21–6–1
|align=left| Mark Flanagan
|
|
|
|align=left|
|align=left|
|- align=center
|Win
|20–6–1
|align=left| Faimasasa Tavu'i
|
|
|
|align=left|
|align=left|
|- align=center
|Lose
|19–6–1
|align=left| Soulan Pownceby
|
|
|
|align=left|
|align=left|
|- align=center
|Win
|19–5–1
|align=left| Fale Siaoloa
|
|
|
|align=left|
|align=left|
|- align=center
|Win
|18–5–1
|align=left| Fale Siaoloa
|
|
|
|align=left|
|align=left|
|- align=center
|Win
|17–5–1
|align=left| Ioane Talamauga
|
|
|
|align=left|
|align=left|
|- align=center
|Win
|16–5–1
|align=left| Ioane Talamauga
|
|
|
|align=left|
|align=left|
|- align=center
|Win
|15–5–1
|align=left| Fale Siaoloa
|
|
|
|align=left|
|align=left|
|- align=center
|Lose
|14–5–1
|align=left| Josh Clenshaw
|
|
|
|align=left|
|align=left| 
|- align=center
|Win
|14–4–1
|align=left| Luke Moloney
|
|
|
|align=left|
|align=left|
|- align=center
|Win
|13–4–1
|align=left| Fale Siaoloa
|
|
|
|align=left|
|align=left|
|- align=center
|Loss
|12–4–1
|align=left| Daniel Geale
|
|
|
|align=left|
|align=left|
|- align=center
|Win
|12–3–1
|align=left| Shane Chapman
|
|
|
|align=left|
|align=left|
|- align=center
|Win
|11–3–1
|align=left| Niusila Seiuli
|
|
|
|align=left|
|align=left|
|- align=center
|Win
|10–3–1
|align=left| Kerey Palmer
|
|
|
|align=left|
|align=left|
|- align=center
|Win
|9–3–1
|align=left| Niusila Seiuli
|
|
|
|align=left|
|align=left|
|- align=center
|Win
|8–3–1
|align=left| Rico Chong Nee
|
|
|
|align=left|
|align=left|
|- align=center
|Win
|7–3–1
|align=left| Jonny Walker
|
|
|
|align=left|
|align=left|
|- align=center
|Win
|6–3–1
|align=left| Fale Siaoloa
|
|
|
|align=left|
|align=left|
|- align=center
|Lose
|5–3–1
|align=left| Charles Njock
|
|
|
|align=left|
|align=left|
|- align=center
|Win
|5–2–1
|align=left| Fili Mailata
|
|
|
|align=left|
|align=left|
|- align=center
|Win
|4–2–1
|align=left| Chris Rehu
|
|
|
|align=left|
|align=left|
|- align=center
|Win
|3–2–1
|align=left| Tapanuu Tagilimai
|
|
|
|align=left|
|align=left|
|- align=center
|Win
|2–2–1
|align=left| Craig Parsons
|
|
|
|align=left|
|align=left|
|- align=center
|Lose
|1–2–1
|align=left| Peter Kazzi
|
|
|
|align=left|
|align=left|
|- align=center
|style="background:#abcdef;"|Draw
|1–1–1
|align=left| Fili Mailata
|
|
|
|align=left|
|align=left|
|- align=center
|Win
|1–1
|align=left| Kali Jacobus
|
|
|
|align=left|
|align=left| 
|- align=center
|Win
|1–0
|align=left| Fili Mailata
|
|
|
|align=left|
|align=left|

References

External links
 

1983 births
New Zealand professional boxing champions
Living people
Boxers from Auckland
New Zealand male boxers
Middleweight boxers
Super-middleweight boxers
Light-heavyweight boxers
The Contender (TV series) participants